Plave is a settlement on the right bank of the Soča River southwest of Anhovo in the Municipality of Kanal ob Soči in the Littoral region of Slovenia.

The parish church in the settlement is dedicated to John the Baptist and belongs to the Diocese of Koper.

References

External links

Plave on Geopedia

Populated places in the Municipality of Kanal
Populated places in the Soča Valley